Armenia competed at the 2002 Winter Paralympics in Salt Lake City, United States. 6 competitors from Armenia won no medals and so did not place in the medal table.

See also 
 Armenia at the Paralympics
 Armenia at the 2002 Winter Olympics

References 

Armenia at the Paralympics
Nations at the 2002 Winter Paralympics
2002 in Armenian sport